was the head of the Taira clan. He was son of Taira no Masamori, and father of Taira no Kiyomori. Tadamori was also governor of the provinces of Harima, Ise, Bizen, and Tajima.

He consolidated the influence of the Taira clan at the Imperial Court, and is said to have been the first samurai to serve the Emperor directly, at Court.

As a servant of the Court, Tadamori waged campaigns, beginning in 1129, against pirates on the coasts of San'yōdō and Nankaidō. He also served his own clan in battling the warrior monks of Nara and of Mount Hiei.

Tadamori is also credited with the construction of the Rengeō-in, a major and now-famous temple in Kyoto, which includes the longest wooden building in the world, the Sanjūsangen-dō. Tadamori was granted the governorship of Tajima province as a reward for completing this project.

Family
 Father: Taira no Masamori
 Wife: Gion no Nyogo (?-1147)
 Sons:
 Taira no Kiyomori
 Taira no Tsunemori
 Taira no Norimori
 Taira no Tadanori

References

Frederic, Louis (2002). Japan Encyclopedia. Cambridge, Massachusetts: Harvard University Press.
Papinot, Edmond (1910). Historical and geographical dictionary of Japan. Tokyo: Librarie Sansaisha.

1096 births
1153 deaths
Taira clan
People of Heian-period Japan